is a railway station on the Kagoshima Main Line, operated by JR Kyushu in Kita-ku, Kumamoto, Japan.

Lines 

Layout 
The station consists of two side platforms serving two tracks at grade. There is no station building, only shelters on both platforms for waiting passengers. Automatic ticket machines are provided. The platforms are linked by a footbridge.

Adjacent stations

History
Japanese Government Railways (JGR) opened  on 1 October 1943 on the existing track of the Kagoshima Main Line. On 10 December 1954, Japanese National Railways (JNR), the postwar successor of JGR, upgrade the facility to a full station. With the privatization of JNR on 1 April 1987, JR Kyushu took over control of the station.

Passenger statistics
In fiscal 2016, the station was used by an average of 883 passengers daily (boarding passengers only), and it ranked 179th among the busiest stations of JR Kyushu.

References

External links
Nishisato (JR Kyushu)

Railway stations in Kumamoto Prefecture
Railway stations in Japan opened in 1954